This list of episodes of Conan details information on the 2021 episodes of Conan, a television program on TBS hosted by Conan O'Brien.

2021

January

February

March

April

May

June

References

Conan (talk show)
Lists of variety television series episodes
Impact of the COVID-19 pandemic on television
2021-related lists